Margaret Peverell, Countess of Derby (b. circa 1114, Nottinghamshire, England), was an English noblewoman who lived at Tutbury Castle in Staffordshire, England.

Family and marriage
Margaret was the daughter of William Peverel the Younger of Peveril Castle in Derbyshire

According to Burke's Dormant, Abeyant, Forfeited and Extinct Peerages, she married Robert de Ferrers, 2nd Earl of Derby and thus became Countess of Derby. She was the mother of William de Ferrers, 3rd Earl of Derby and William De Ferrers, Lord of Eggington and a daughter, Petronella.{Burke's Dormant, Abeyant, Forfeited and Extinct Peerages}

She died in 1154 and was buried in Merevale Abbey.

References

12th-century births
12th-century deaths
English countesses
12th-century English people 
12th-century English women
People from Derbyshire
People from the Borough of East Staffordshire